Teofisto Jamora Guingona Sr. (born Teofisto Guingona y Jamora; September 20, 1883 – April 11, 1963) was a Filipino revolutionary soldier, lawyer, judge, and politician. He was father of former Vice President Teofisto Guingona Jr. and the grandfather of former Senator TG Guingona.

Early life
He was born in Guimaras, Iloilo, on September 20, 1883 to Don Vicente Guingona and Doña Francisca Jamora. Guingona joined the insurgent army when the revolution against Spain broke out. He became the first Municipal Treasurer of Nabalas from 1899 to 1901. He then became Municipal President from 1901 to 1902.

Educational life
In 1907, Guingona graduated from the Escuela de Derecho with the degree of Bachelor of Laws.

Political life
He was elected Assemblyman from the 2nd district of Negros Oriental in 1909 and was re-elected to the same post in 1912. Guingona then resigned from the Legislature and served as Governor of Agusan from 1914 to 1917; the province is now divided as Agusan del Norte and del Sur. He then served as acting Governor of Department of Mindanao and Sulu from 1918 to 1920. He was also the first Director of the Bureau of Non-Christian Tribes in 1920. In 1920, Guingona Sr. was appointed as Senator for the 12th Senatorial District comprising Mindanao and Sulu until his resignation in 1923. From 1924 to 1930, he was the chief of the legal department of Levy Hermanos, Inc. Guingona Sr. served as the Judge of the Court of First Instance from 1930 to 1931. He served again as Director of the Bureau of Non-Christian Tribes until its abolition in 1935.

Personal life
He was married to Josefa Tayko and had 8 children, including Efraim, Inday, Eduardo, Manuel, Luis, Teofisto Jr., and twins Benjamin and Jose.

Death
He died on April 11, 1963 due to stroke.

References

External links
"Biographical Directory Guingona, Teopisto." Encyclopedic Directory of the Philippines Vol. III. Cornejo, M.R. Pre-War. pp. 1773–1774.

1883 births
1963 deaths
People of the Philippine Revolution
Members of the House of Representatives of the Philippines from Negros Oriental
Senators of the 6th Philippine Legislature
Senators of the 5th Philippine Legislature
Governors of former provinces of the Philippines
Filipino judges
People from Guimaras
Mayors of places in Guimaras
Members of the Philippine Legislature
Visayan people